The California Golden Bears baseball team represents the University of California, Berkeley in NCAA Division I college baseball. Along with most other California athletic teams, the baseball team participates in the Pac-12 Conference. The Bears play their home games at Evans Diamond.

History
The Bears have appeared in the NCAA Division I baseball tournament 13 times, and in the College World Series 6 times. They have won two National Championships: at the first College World Series in 1947 and again in 1957. In 1964, future major leaguer Mike Epstein batted .384 for the team and was named an All-American.

In 2010, the university announced that baseball would be one of five sports cut as a cost-cutting measure. However, in April 2011, after receiving more than $9 million in pledges from supporters of the program, the program was reinstated. Even donors from Stanford University, California's biggest rival, pitched in to help save the Golden Bears baseball team.

Season-by-season results

|-
| colspan="2"  style="text-align:center" | Total: || 2,637–1,986–15 (.570) || colspan="4" |

Source:

Coaches

Source:

Former Bears in Major League Baseball
Some notable Bears who have played in the Major Leagues include:

John Baker
Brennan Boesch
Lance Blankenship- former Oakland A’s utility player
Geoff Blum
Rod Booker
Mark Canha, outfielder, New York Mets
Chuck Cary
Sam Chapman
Allen Craig- former first baseman, St. Louis Cardinals
Taylor Douthit
Mike Epstein
Jerry Goff, father of ex-Cal bear and current Detroit Lions quarterback Jared Goff
Brett Jackson
Conor Jackson-former outfielder 
Jackie Jensen
 Andrew Knapp, catcher, San Francisco Giants
Jeff Kent- former San Francisco Giants second baseman who played with Barry Bonds
Darren Lewis
Kevin Maas
Bob Melvin-current manager of the San Diego Padres
Andy Messersmith
Brandon Morrow, pitcher
Xavier Nady
Orval Overall
Earl Robinson
Tyson Ross- former starting pitcher
Josh Satin
Marcus Semien- infielder, Texas Rangers
Michael Santiago-Smith
 Andrew Vaughn- first baseman and outfielder, Chicago White Sox
Tyler Walker

See also
List of NCAA Division I baseball programs

References

External links